Reva Jackman (January 16, 1886 – November 1985) was an American painter, muralist, printmaker, designer and illustrator born in Wichita, Kansas.  She studied at the School of the Art Institute of Chicago with Wellington J. Reynolds and in Paris with André Lhote and Frank Armington

She was an artist with the Federal Art Project and painted post office murals; notable works include Trek of the Covered Wagon to Indiana in the post office in Attica, Indiana and Pioneer Home in Bushnell in Bushnell, Illinois.

References

1880s births
1985 deaths
American women painters
Modern painters
School of the Art Institute of Chicago alumni
American muralists
20th-century American painters
Artists from Wichita, Kansas
Section of Painting and Sculpture artists
20th-century American women artists
Women muralists
Federal Art Project artists
Date of death missing
Place of death missing